Bembecia pavicevici is a moth of the family Sesiidae. It is found on the Balkan Peninsula.

The wingspan is 25–26 mm.

The larvae feed on the roots of Coronilla emerus.

Subspecies
Bembecia pavicevici pavicevici (Istria, Dalmatia, Macedonia, Hvar, Greece)
Bembecia pavicevici dobrovskyi Špatenka, 1997 (southern Greece)

References

Moths described in 1813
Sesiidae
Moths of Europe